Pseudobryomima is a genus of moths of the family Noctuidae. The genus was erected by William Barnes and Foster Hendrickson Benjamin in 1927.

Species
 Pseudobryomima distans (Barnes & McDunnough, 1912)
 Pseudobryomima fallax (Hampson, 1906)
 Pseudobryomima muscosa (Hampson, 1906)

References

Cuculliinae